Kurt Harald Isenstein (13 August 1898 – 3 February 1980) was a German sculptor. His work was part of the sculpture event in the art competition at the 1928 Summer Olympics.

References

1898 births
1980 deaths
20th-century German sculptors
20th-century German male artists
German male sculptors
Olympic competitors in art competitions
People from Hanover